Valentin Afanasyevich Koptyug (June 9, 1931 – January 10, 1997) was a Soviet and Russian scientist, specializing in physical and organic chemistry.

Biography 
Valentin Koptyug was born in 1931 in Yukhnov in the family of Afanasy Koptyug, who was director of the local communication department, and Nadezhda Koptyug, who was a telegrapher. When young Koptyug was studying in school, his family had to evacuate because of Great Patriotic War. In 1949 he finished school in Samarkand and graduated from D. Mendeleev University of Chemical Technology of Russia in 1954 in Moscow. In 1957, Koptyg completed postgraduate studies at this institution. He worked at the Mendeleev University from 1957 to 1959.

In 1959 the scientist began his career at the Institute of Organic Chemistry in Novosibirsk, where he was the head of the laboratory from 1959 to 1987, and then the director of this institute (1987–1997).

He was a chancellor of Novosibirsk State University for two years (1978–1980). Koptyug made a huge contribution in development of synthetic, physical and applied chemistry. Also, he founded some large scientific schools in the fields of organic chemistry and chemoinformatics.

There are a monument and a street named after Koptyug in Akademgorodok, Novosibirsk. Also, there are several awards and grants of his name for students and scientists.

Valentin Koptyug was buried at the Yuzhnoye Cemetery in Novosibirsk.

References

External links 
 Profile of V. A. Koptyug at the official site of Siberian Branch of the Russian Academy of Sciences
 Memorial library of V. A. Koptyug
 "Lessons from Koptyug" - an article by Yu.G. Demyanko, Candidate of Technical Sciences, Head of Department at Keldysh Research Center
 "Sustainable Development: A Lesson from Valentin Koptyug We Are Yet to Learn" - an article prepared by Alla Kobkova
 "The Contribution and Legacy of Academician V.A. Koptyug to the International Union of Pure and Applied Chemistry (IUPAC)" - an article by John Corish at "Pure and Applied Chemistry" (Volume 90. Issue 11)  
 Photos of the Koptyug's monument at Akademgorodok, Novosibirsk  

1931 births
1997 deaths
20th-century Russian chemists
People from Yukhnovsky District
Central Committee of the Communist Party of the Soviet Union members
Eleventh convocation members of the Soviet of Nationalities
D. Mendeleev University of Chemical Technology of Russia alumni
Foreign Fellows of the Indian National Science Academy
Foreign Members of the Bulgarian Academy of Sciences
Foreign Members of the National Academy of Sciences of Belarus
Full Members of the Russian Academy of Sciences
Full Members of the USSR Academy of Sciences
Heroes of Socialist Labour
Lenin Prize winners
Recipients of the Order of Lenin
Recipients of the Order of the Red Banner of Labour
Russian chemists
Soviet chemists
Scientists from Novosibirsk
Burials at Yuzhnoye Cemetery (Novosibirsk)